The BFW N.I was a prototype night bomber aircraft developed in Germany during the First World War.

Development
In August 1917, Idflieg instructed BFW to develop a night bomber able to carry 500 kg of bombs. The resulting N.I was a two-seat triplane powered by one Mercedes D.IVa inline engine. The N.I first flew in the summer of 1918 but did not enter production.

Specifications

References

Bibliography

N.1
1910s German bomber aircraft
Aircraft first flown in 1918